The SNAS Stryke-Air Bi is a French powered parachute that was designed and produced by Société Nouvelle d'Aviation Sportive (SNAS) of Noillac. Now out of production, when it was available the aircraft was supplied complete and ready-to-fly.

The aircraft was introduced in about 2001 and production ended when the company went out of business in 2004.

Design and development
It features a parachute-style wing, two-seats-in-tandem accommodation, tricycle landing gear and a single  Zanzottera MZ 34 engine in pusher configuration. The  Zanzottera MZ 201 engine was a factory option.

The aircraft carriage is built from 4130 steel tubing. In flight steering is accomplished via handles that actuate the canopy brakes, creating roll and yaw. On the ground the aircraft has foot pedal-controlled nosewheel steering. The main landing gear incorporates spring rod suspension. There is a fixed vertical fin to reduce propeller torque effects. Unusually the pilot sits in the back and the passenger is accommodated in the front seat.

Specifications (Stryke-Air Bi)

References

External links
Company website archives on Archive.org

Bi
2000s French sport aircraft
2000s French ultralight aircraft
Single-engined pusher aircraft
Powered parachutes